Vaira Nenjam is a 1975 Indian Tamil-language action thriller film written, directed and produced by C. V. Sridhar. The film stars Sivaji Ganesan, Padmapriya, R. Muthuraman and K. Balaji. It is a remake of Sridhar's own 1973 Hindi film Gehri Chaal. The film was released on 2 November 1975.

Plot

Cast 
Sivaji Ganesan as Ananth
Padmapriya as Geetha
R. Muthuraman as Shankar
K. Balaji as Madhan
Dhulipala as Dharmalingam
C. I. D. Sakunthala as Shoba
Sachu as Shanthi
Haalam as a dancer

Production 
After the failure of his previous directorial Alaigal (1973), Sridhar decided to make an action film with Ganesan in lead role after Sridhar felt audiences were being more receptive to action films than classic films. The film was titled Hero 72, with Sridhar opting to make it a Tamil-Hindi bilingual, with Jeetendra starring in the Hindi version that was later titled Gehri Chaal. Production on the Tamil version that was later titled Vaira Nenjam progressed slowly because of call sheet issues of Ganesan; Gehri Chaal was completed and released much earlier. In between the delays, Sridhar made Urimaikural (1974) starring M. G. Ramachandran.

Soundtrack 
All songs were composed by M. S. Viswanathan and penned by Kannadasan. The song "Sentamizh Paadum" attained popularity.

Release and reception 
Vaira Nenjam was released on 2 November 1975. Kanthan of Kalki said the film, despite its title, was not lustrous like a real diamond. Arthur Paris from Film World wrote, "The film has no soul, no life and is at once dull, pedestrian and moronic". The film was successful only with B and C centre audiences.

References

External links 
 

1970s action thriller films
1970s Tamil-language films
1975 films
Films directed by C. V. Sridhar
Films scored by M. S. Viswanathan
Films with screenplays by C. V. Sridhar
Indian action thriller films
Tamil remakes of Hindi films